Mei (May) is a poem written by the Dutch poet Herman Gorter and published in 1889. It established Gorter's reputation as a poet and one of the foremost writers of the Tachtigers movement. It is one of the most famous poems in the Dutch language. It has 4,381 lines.

The opening lines are some of the most famous in dutch literature:

The poem was published in De Nieuwe Gids, a poetry journal.

Translations
The poem has been translated into several languages:
 French, translated by Nicolas Ouwehand and published in 2017
 Western Frisian, translated by Klaas Bruinsma published in 1998
 English, translated by M. Kruijff and published in 2021.

References

Mei on Wikisource

Dutch poems
1889 poems